The Father Edgar Martin Basketball Invitational Tournament, better known as the Fr. Martin Cup, is a pre-season collegiate basketball tournament in the Philippines. It gathers teams from various collegiate leagues, including the UAAP and NCAA, in a basketball tournament just before the start of the collegiate season. It was named after Fr. Edgar Martin, S.J., the former athletic moderator at the Ateneo de Manila University, and former Secretary-General of the Basketball Association of the Philippines. The tournament was established in 1994.

Tournament format
Its format consists of dividing the teams into 2 groups featuring single round robin elimination games among teams of the same group to determine the playoff teams. The playoffs feature a crossover format, with the top seeds of each group facing off against the 4th seed of their opposites and the 2nd seeds slugging it out with the opposite side’s 3rd seeds until a champion is determined.

Championship results

See also
 College basketball in the Philippines
 List of Philippine men's collegiate basketball champions

References

External links
 Samahang Basketbol ng Pilipinas
 2011 Father Martin Cup

College men's basketball competitions in the Philippines